Francesco "Franco" Arese (born 13 April 1944 in Centallo) is an Italian middle-distance runner, competing mainly at 1500 m. Arese won the 1500 meters final at the 1971 European Athletics Championships in Helsinki, Finland.

He was the President of Italian Athletics Federation (FIDAL).

Biography
Arese has won several Italian championships on 800, 1500 and 5000 meters. He competed in both the 1968 Summer Olympics in Mexico City and the 1972 Summer Olympics in Munich, but on both occasions failed to qualify for the final.

National titles
He won 12 times the national championship.
 4 wins in 800 metres at the Italian Athletics Championships (1968, 1969, 1972, 1973)
 4 wins in 1500 metres at the Italian Athletics Championships (1986, 1967, 1968, 1970)
 1 win in 5000 metres at the Italian Athletics Championships (1971)
 1 win in Cross country running at the Italian Athletics Championships (1970)
 1 win in 1500 metres at the Italian Athletics Indoor Championships (1972)
 1 win in 3000 metres at the Italian Athletics Indoor Championships (1970)

See also
 FIDAL Hall of Fame

References

External links
 

1944 births
Living people
Italian male cross country runners
Italian male middle-distance runners
Athletes (track and field) at the 1968 Summer Olympics
Athletes (track and field) at the 1972 Summer Olympics
Olympic athletes of Italy
European Athletics Championships medalists
Universiade medalists in athletics (track and field)
Mediterranean Games silver medalists for Italy
Mediterranean Games medalists in athletics
Athletes (track and field) at the 1971 Mediterranean Games
Universiade gold medalists for Italy